Shi Siming (19th day of the 1st month, 703? – 18 April 761), or Shi Sugan, was a Chinese military general, monarch, and politician during the Tang Dynasty who followed his childhood friend An Lushan in rebelling against Tang, and who later succeeded An Lushan's son An Qingxu as emperor of the Yan state that An Lushan established.

Background
It is not known when Shi Sugan was born, other than that he was born one day before his friend An Lushan and that they grew up together.  He was of Tujue extraction, and was said to be thin with smooth skin, with an impatient disposition. After both he and An grew up, they were both known for their bravery. However, he was poor and of low social station, and was looked down by the people of his locale. However, a Lady Xin, a daughter of local gentry, insisted on marrying him despite her family's opposition, and she was eventually successful in doing so.

Under Emperor Xuanzong's rule
Shi Sugan first served under the Tang Dynasty general Wu Zhiyi, and it was said that whenever Wu ordered him to attack, he would be able to capture enemy soldiers and return with them.  As he and An Lushan each understood six non-Han languages, they both served in military interrogation as interpreters. He later served under the general Zhang Shougui, along with An.  Early in Emperor Xuanzong's Tianbao era (741–756), because of Shi's repeated military accomplishments, he was made a general at Pinglu Army (平盧, headquartered in modern Chaoyang, Liaoning).  Once, when he was in the capital Chang'an to make reports to Emperor Xuanzong, Emperor Xuanzong was impressed with him and patted his back, stating, "You, Lord, will one day be honored.  Keep this in mind."  He had Shi change his name to Siming (literally meaning, "thinking of brightness").  Shi later served as the governor of Beiping Commandery (北平, roughly modern Qinhuangdao, Hebei).  In 751, after a major defeat that An, who was then the military governor (jiedushi) of Pinglu (then converted into a military circuit) as well as Fanyang (范陽, headquartered in modern Beijing) and Hedong (河東, headquartered in modern Taiyuan, Shanxi) Circuits, suffered at the hands of the Xi, Shi reorganized the collapsed troops to prevent further disaster, drawing accolades from An—although Shi commented that if he had met An just slightly earlier after the defeat, he would have been executed, as were Ge Jie and Yu Chengxian, two other generals whom An blamed for the defeat.  In 752, at An's recommendation, Shi was made Bingma Shi, a commanding officer of Pinglu soldiers.

During the Anshi Rebellion

Under An Lushan's rule

In 755, An Lushan rose against Emperor Xuanzong's rule, and Shi Siming served under him.  Initially, the Tang commanderies north of the Yellow River nearly all submitted to An, allowing An to quickly advance south and capture the Tang eastern capital Luoyang, but around the new year 756, the official Yan Gaoqing, who had earlier submitted to An, rose against An at Changshan Commandery (常山, roughly modern Shijiazhuang, Hebei), which he was governor of, leading to a flurry of other commanderies turning against An as well.  An, who was then at Luoyang, sent Shi and Li Lijie to attack Changshan and Boling (博陵, roughly modern Baoding, Hebei) Commanderies.  Just eight days after Yan's defection, Shi and Cai Xide both arrived at Changshan and captured Yan, who was delivered to Luoyang and executed.  Shi, Li, and Cai then attacked the other commanderies that had risen along with Yan, and they resubmitted to An, who declared himself the emperor of a new state of Yan.  Lu Quancheng, the governor of Raoyang Commandery (饒陽, roughly modern Hengshui, Hebei), however, refused to submit, and Shi put Raoyang under siege but could not quickly capture it, and was forced to lift the siege when the Tang general Li Guangbi arrived with relief troops from Hedong Circuit.  Subsequently, he and Li Guangbi and another Tang general, Guo Ziyi, engaged in a number of battles, largely to Shi's detriment, eventually causing many commanderies to rise against An again.  This caused An much concern, and at one point, An considered abandoning Luoyang and heading back north.  Eventually, however, the situation changed when the Tang general Geshu Han was defeated at Tong Pass by another Yan general, Cui Qianyou, and Yan troops were able to capture Chang'an and force both Emperor Xuanzong and his crown prince Li Heng to flee—with Li Heng fleeing to Lingwu and declaring himself emperor there (as Emperor Suzong).  Guo and Li Guangbi abandoned their campaign against Shi and went to Lingwu as well, thus allowing Shi to largely repacify the region north of the Yellow River for Yan.  When Liu Zhengchen, who had risen against An at Pinglu, made a surprise attack on Fanyang, Shi defeated Liu, forcing him to flee back to Pinglu.

Under An Qingxu's rule
In spring 757, An Lushan was killed by his son An Qingxu, who succeeded to the Yan throne.  Meanwhile, though, Shi Siming, who had not received the news of An Lushan's death, attacked Taiyuan, where Li Guangbi was at that point, along with Cai Xide, Gao Xiuyan, and Niu Tingjie, with 100,000 troops total.  They besieged Taiyuan for more than a month, but could not capture it.  The news of An Lushan's death then arrived, and An Qingxu further ordered Shi to return to Fanyang to guard it, leaving Cai at Taiyuan to watch Li Guangbi.  An Qingxu also made Shi the military governor of Fanyang and created him the Prince of Guichuan.  Shi, however, hoarding the supplies that An Lushan had previously shipped to Fanyang, began to disobey An Qingxu's orders, and An Qingxu could not keep him in check.  In winter 757, after An Qingxu was forced to abandon Luoyang after a joint Tang/Huihe counterattack, various non-Han tribal troops abandoned An Qingxu and fled north.  Shi induced the elite Yeluohe troops, as well as various other tribes, to submit to him, but the Tongluo forces refused, and he then defeated them.

Meanwhile, An Qingxu sent the generals Ashina Chengqing and An Shouzhong to Fanyang to requisition troops from Shi, and also see if they could seize Fanyang.  Shi, under the advice of his assistant Geng Renzhi, turned against An Qingxu, detaining Ashina and An Shouzhong, and offering to submit to Tang instead, along with Gao.  Emperor Suzong was pleased.  He commissioned Shi as the military governor of Fanyang and created him the Prince of Guiyi.  He also sent the eunuch Li Sijing and Wu Zhiyi's son Wu Cheng'en to comfort Shi.

Brief submission to Emperor Suzong and re-rebellion
After Shi Siming's submission to Tang, the other nearby prefectures also largely submitted to Tang, leaving An Qingxu isolated in Yecheng, holding only Yecheng and its surrounding region.  However, a number of Tang generals, including Li Guangbi and Zhang Gao, doubted Shi's sincerity.  In summer 759, under Li Guangbi's advice, Emperor Suzong had Wu Cheng'en try to persuade Ashina Chengqing into killing Shi together and seizing Fanyang.  Shi discovered this and put Wu to death.  He did not initially formally turn against Tang, but made an ultimatum demanding Li Guangbi's death.  Meanwhile, though, with An Qingxu seeking aid from him, he launched his troops and headed south toward Yecheng.  Shi quickly captured Wei Prefecture (魏州, in modern Handan, Hebei) from the Tang general Cui Guangyuan, and then declared himself "the Great Holy Prince of Yan" in spring 760.

Meanwhile, the Tang generals Guo Ziyi, Lu Jiong, Li Huan, Xu Shuji, Li Siye, Ji Guangchen, Cui Guangyuan, Dong Qin, Li Guangbi, and Wang Sili, were gathering at Yecheng and putting it under siege.  An Qingxu tried to fight out of the siege, but was defeated by Tang forces, and his brother An Qinghe was killed.  Meanwhile, An sent the general Xue Song to Fanyang to seek aid from Shi, offering the throne to him.  Shi thus advanced south toward Yecheng.  Meanwhile, Tang forces, under the command of nine generals (with Li Siye having died during the siege), were uncoordinated.  On 7 April 759, Shi engaged Tang forces—and, when a storm suddenly arrived, both armies panicked; Shi's forces fled north, and Tang forces fled south, lifting the siege on Yecheng.  An Qingxu's forces gathered the food and supplies abandoned by Tang forces, and An thereafter considered, with Sun Xiaozhe and Cui the possibility of refusing Shi, who gathered his troops and again approached Yecheng, admittance.  Shi himself was not communicating with An, but was feasting his soldiers and watching Yecheng.  Zhang and Gao Shang requested permission to meet Shi, and An agreed; Shi gave them gifts and let them return to Yecheng.  An, unsure what to do, again offered the throne to Shi, which Shi declined.  Shi, instead, suggested to him that perhaps they could both be emperors of independent, allied states.  An, pleased, exited Yecheng and met with Shi to swear to the alliance.

When An met Shi, he kneeled down to thank Shi for his help, stating:

Shi suddenly changed his expression and rebuked An:

Shi then executed An Qingxu, his four brothers, Gao, Sun, and Cui.  He took over An's territory and troops, but returned to Fanyang and left his oldest son Shi Chaoyi in charge of Yecheng.  He soon claimed for himself the title of emperor of Yan.  He created his wife Lady Xin empress, Shi Chaoyi the Prince of Huai, and made Zhou Zhi his chancellor and Li Guiren, the main chieftain who of the non-Han forces that had submitted to him in 757, his chief general.

As emperor
Shi Siming soon left Empress Xin's son Shi Chaoqing in charge of Fanyang and headed south. He quickly captured Bian Prefecture (汴州, roughly modern Kaifeng, Henan) and Luoyang, but his further attempts to advance were rebuffed by Tang forces at Heyang (河陽, in modern Jiaozuo, Henan) and Shan Prefecture (陝州, roughly modern Sanmenxia, Henan), and the sides stalemated.

At this time, Shi was described as cruel and prone to kill, terrorizing his army. He favored Shi Chaoqing over Shi Chaoyi and considered creating Shi Chaoqing crown prince and killing Shi Chaoyi.  

In spring 761, Shi Siming began another attempt to attack Shan Prefecture, wanting to attack Chang'an. He had Shi Chaoyi serve as his forward commander, but Shi Chaoyi was repeatedly repelled by the Tang general Wei Boyu. Shi Siming was angered by Shi Chaoyi's failures and considered punishing him and the generals below him. On 18 April, Shi Siming ordered Shi Chaoyi to build a triangular fort with a hill as its side, to store food supplies, and ordered that it be completed in one day.  Near the end of the day, Shi Chaoyi had completed it, but had not plastered the walls with mud, when Shi Siming arrived and rebuked him for not applying mud.  He ordered his own servants to stay and watch the plastering.  He then angrily stated, "After I capture Shan Prefecture, I will kill you, thief!" That night, Shi Chaoyi's subordinates Luo Yue and Cai Wenjing warned him that he was in dire straits—and that if he refused to take action to depose Shi Siming, they would defect to Tang. Shi Chaoyi agreed to take action, and Luo persuaded Shi Siming's guard commander General Cao (personal name lost to history) to agree with the plot.  That night, Luo led 300 soldiers and ambushed Shi Siming, binding him and then beginning a return to Luoyang with the troops.  On the way back to Luoyang, Luo feared that someone might try to rescue Shi Siming, and so strangled him to death.

Shi Chaoyi enthroned as the new emperor of Yan. He was eventually defeated by Tang forces and committed suicide in 763.

Personal
His wife was Empress Xin (created 759, executed 761), mother of Crown Prince Chaoqing. He had three children: Shi Chaoyi (史朝義), the Prince of Huai (created 759) and later emperor of the state of Yan. The other son being Shi Chaoqing (史朝清), the Crown Prince (executed 761) whose mother was Empress Xin. Shi Siming had at least five more sons.

Popular culture 
 Portrayed by Wong Chun-tong in 2000 Hong Kong television series, The Legend of Lady Yang
 Portrayed by Lu Xingyu in the 2017 Chinese television series, The Glory of Tang Dynasty

References

Further reading 
 Old Book of Tang, vol. 200, part 1.
 New Book of Tang, vol. 225, part 1.
 Zizhi Tongjian, vols. 214, 216, 217, 218, 219, 220, 221, 222.

703 births
761 deaths
8th-century Chinese monarchs
8th-century murdered monarchs
Deaths by strangulation
Founding monarchs
Tang dynasty jiedushi of Lulong Circuit
Tang dynasty nonimperial princes
Tang dynasty rebels
Yan (An–Shi) emperors